Holland Medical High School is a public health sciences magnet school within Abilene Independent School District (AISD) in Abilene, Texas. It is located at 2442 Cedar Street on the campus of Hardin-Simmons University (HSU) directly across the street from the sprawling Hendrick Medical Center. The school was proposed in 2005 to be the first "school of choice" within AISD, giving the districts growing Health Occupations programs space to grow and expand. This building was completed in conjunction with HSU in 2007 with its grand opening held on February 7, 2008.

The school is named after David S. "Scotty" Holland, a former student at HSU and current Chairman of the Board for Trend Exploration I LLC oil company. Mr. Holland spoke at the school's grand opening.

Mission & purpose
"The mission of Holland Medical High School is to prepare and produce quality health care workers to meet the needs of the Abilene health care community and the state of Texas."
"The purpose of Holland Medical High School is to provide a uniform quality education by integrating rigorous academics with relevant courses in health care for students in the Abilene Independent School District interested in pursuing careers as health care professionals."

Courses offered
Health Science Technology I, II & III
Medical Terminology
Anatomy & Physiology
Independent Study

Opportunities for certification
Students attending Holland Medical have opportunities to acquire numerous licenses and certifications during their time in the program.
First Aid-AHA Healthcare Provider, CPA-AHA Heartsaver Adult Only, and CPR-Adult and PBLS are completed during Health Science Technology I.
Feeding Assistant and Certified Nurse Aide (CNA) are completed during Health Science Technology II.
Health Science Technology III students can complete certifications as Pharmacy Technicians or as Emergency Care Attendants and Emergency Medical Dispatchers.
Independent Study students can complete Phlebotomy Technician certifications through TSTC-West Texas just a short drive from Holland Medical.

References

External links
 Official Website

High schools in Taylor County, Texas
Magnet schools in Texas
Public high schools in Texas
Abilene Independent School District